Boom is a nickname for:

 Ernest Carter (drummer)
 Daniel Boom Desjardins (born 1971), French-Canadian singer
 Dan Herron (born 1989), American National Football League player
 Anthony Boom Labrusca (born 1989), Filipino actor
 Johannes Boom Prinsloo (born 1989), South African rugby union footballer
 Hugh Trenchard, 1st Viscount Trenchard (1873-1956), marshal of the Royal Air Force
 Jason Alan Fry (CPA MSA)
 Charles Boom Strydom (born 1987), South African

See also 

 
 
 Boom Boom (nickname)
 Boomer (nickname)

Lists of people by nickname